Cevher Özer (born 24 January 1983) is a Turkish professional basketball player for Konyaspor of the Turkish Basketbol Süper Ligi (BSL). He occupies the power forward position.

References

External links
 TBLStat.net Profile

1983 births
Living people
Afyonkarahisar Belediyespor players
Bandırma B.İ.K. players
Beşiktaş men's basketball players
Darüşşafaka Basketbol players
Galatasaray S.K. (men's basketball) players
OGM Ormanspor players
Power forwards (basketball)
TED Ankara Kolejliler players
Turkish men's basketball players
Türk Telekom B.K. players